The Tumbala climbing rat (Tylomys tumbalensis) is a species of rodent in the family Cricetidae.
It is found in Mexico, where it is known only from one locality in Tumbalá, Chiapas. The species is threatened by deforestation.

References

Musser, G. G. and M. D. Carleton. 2005. Superfamily Muroidea. pp. 894–1531 in Mammal Species of the World a Taxonomic and Geographic Reference. D. E. Wilson and D. M. Reeder eds. Johns Hopkins University Press, Baltimore.

Tylomys
EDGE species
Mammals described in 1901
Taxonomy articles created by Polbot